is a Japanese visual technology company, founded in March 1968, which manufactures display products and other solutions for markets such as business, healthcare, graphics, air traffic control, and maritime. The company is headquartered in Hakusan, Ishikawa Prefecture.

Name
The name EIZO, pronounced AY-ZO, comes from the Japanese kanji meaning "image".

History

The company was founded as Hakui Electronic Corporation in Hakui, Ishikawa, Japan, in 1968; it initially manufactured televisions. In March 1973, it became Nanao Corporation. In 1976, it began manufacture of industrial monitors, and in 1978 it entered the gaming market by manufacturing and selling tabletop video arcade machines. In 1981 it started making PC monitors.

Company milestones
1967 – Nanao Electric Co., Ltd. was founded in Fukui, Ishikawa prefecture
1978 – Production of CRTs arcade game cabinets of Space Invaders
1980 – Acquisition of video game developer and publisher Irem Corporation
1981 – New factory opened in Hakusan, Ishikawa prefecture
1981 – Production of computer monitors, video cassette recorders and radio cassette TVs
1984 – Start of distribution in Europe under the brand EIZO
1984 – Foundation of Hitec Associates Ltd as a sales subsidiary of Nanao specifically for the European market.
1984 – Foundation of Nanao USA in California, United States to launch products in that region under the same "Nanao" brand as in Japan
1985 – "EIZO" was launched as a brand of Hitec Associates in Europe.
1985 – 7030 12-inch CRT monitor
1990 – Headquarters moved to Mattō, Ishikawa (now Hakusan)
1990 – January, Hitec Associates Ltd was renamed Eizo Corporation.
1991 – Production and sales of computer monitors in Japan under the brand NANAO
1993 – Production of the NANAO FA-1020 LCD monitor
1996 – Brand unified under the name EIZO
1996 – New logo design unveiled
1997 – Foundation of Irem Software Engineering Inc. (a subsidiary company that replaces Irem Corporation)
1997 – Production of the FlexScan L23 13.8 LCD monitor
1998 – Production of the FlexScan L66, the world first 1280 x 1024 resolution monitor
1999 – Nanao Corporation and Eizo Corporation merged to become Eizo Nanao Corporation.
2001 – Production of the FlexScan L675, the then monitor world smallest bezels of 19mm
2002 – Production of monitors for medical imaging under the brand RadiForce
2004 – Production of the ColorEdge CG220, the world's first monitor capable of reproducing the Adobe RGB colorspace
2005 – Receives ISO 13485 certification as the first stand-alone monitor manufacturer
2007 – Awarded with the Long Life Design Award from the Japan Institute of Design Promotion
2013 – Eizo Nanao Corporation changed its name to Eizo Corporation.
2013 – Production of the FORIS FG2421, the world's first 240 Hz monitor
2015 – Production of the monitors with 1mm thin bezels
2016 – Acquisition of Panasonic Healthcare Co. Ltd's endoscopy monitor business.
2018 – Acquisition of Carina System Co.Ltd., a company that develops camera hardware and software for the healthcare and broadcasting markets.

Products 

Eizo's product portfolio includes:
 Business LCD Monitors (FlexScan Series)
 Graphics monitors (ColorEdge Series)
 Arcade machine monitors
 Touch panel, IP Decoders and Industrial monitors (DuraVision Series)
 Medical display systems (RadiForce Series)
 OR Area camera and display systems (CuratOR Series)
 Home entertainment monitors (FORIS Series)
 Air traffic control monitors (Raptor Series)
 Accessories

References and footnotes

External links

 Official website (Global)
 Official website (USA)
 Official website (Europe)
 Official website (Japan)

Electronics companies of Japan
Display technology companies
Software companies of Japan
Companies listed on the Tokyo Stock Exchange
Companies based in Ishikawa Prefecture
Electronics companies established in 1968
Japanese brands
Japanese companies established in 1968